For the Battle of Leyte Gulf, see Leyte Gulf order of battle

On 17 October 1944, troops of the United States Sixth Army under the direct command of Lieutenant General Walter Krueger, invaded the Philippine island of Leyte. This operation was the beginning of General Douglas MacArthur's fulfillment of his promise in March 1942 to the Filipino people that he would liberate them from Japanese rule.

MacArthur's formal title was Supreme Commander, Allied Forces, Southwest Pacific Area. The amphibious landings were carried out and supported by the United States Seventh Fleet, including 1 British and 11 Australian ships, under the direction of Vice Admiral Thomas C. Kinkaid.

 Seventh Fleet
 Combat ships: 18 escort carriers, 6 old battleships, 5 heavy cruisers, 4 light cruisers, 34 destroyers, 17 destroyer escorts 
 280+ amphibious landing and support ships
 110+ auxiliaries

In case the Imperial Japanese Navy interfered, additional air cover was provided by the fast carriers of the US Third Fleet under the command of Admiral William F. Halsey, Jr.. 
 Third Fleet
 9 fleet carriers, 8 light carriers, 6 fast battleships, 4 heavy cruisers, 7 light cruisers, 3 anti-aircraft light cruisers, 58 destroyers

US Seventh Fleet 

Vice Admiral Thomas C. Kinkaid in amphibious command ship Wasatch

Combat Units

Central Philippines Attack Force (Task Force 77) 
Vice Admiral Kinkaid

Flag group 
 1 light cruiser
 1 Brooklyn-class (15 × 6-in. main battery): Nashville
 4 destroyers
 All Fletcher-class (5 × 5-in. main battery): Ammen, Abner Read, Mullany, Bush

Close Covering Group (Task Group 77.3) 
Rear Admiral Russell S. Berkey

 2 heavy cruisers
 Both County-class (8 × 8-in. main battery):  Australia,  Shropshire
 2 light cruisers
 Both Brooklyn-class (15 × 6-in. main battery): Phoenix, Boise
 6 destroyers
 4 Fletcher class (5 × 5-in. main battery): Bache, Beale, Daly, Killen
 2 Tribal-class (8 × 4.7-in. main battery):  Arunta,  Warramunga

Escort Carrier Group (Task Group 77.4) 

Rear Admiral Thomas L. Sprague

 "Taffy 1"
 Rear Admiral T.L. Sprague

 6 escort carriers
 Sangamon (Capt. M.E. Browder)
 Air Group 37 (Lt. Cmdr. S.E. Hindman)
 17 F6F Hellcat fighters
   9 TBM Avenger torpedo bombers
 Suwannee (Capt. W.D. Johnson)
 Air Group 60 (Lt. Cmdr. H.O. Feilbach, USNR)
 22 F6F Hellcat fighters
   9 TBM Avenger torpedo bombers
 Chenango (Capt. George van Deurs)
 Air Group 35 (Lt. Cmdr. F.T. Moore)
 22 F6F Hellcat fighters
   9 TBM Avenger torpedo bombers
 Santee (Capt. Robert E. Blick)
 Air Group 26 (Lt. Cmdr. H.N. Funk)
 24 FM-2 Wildcat fighters
   6 TBF Avenger, 3 TBM Avenger torpedo bombers
 Carrier Division 28 (Rear Adm. George R. Henderson)
 Saginaw Bay (Capt. F.C. Sutton)
 Composite Squadron 78 (Lt. Cmdr. J.L. Hyde, USNR)
 15 FM-2 Wildcat fighters
 12 TBM Avenger torpedo bombers
 Petrof Bay (Capt. J.L. Kane)
 Composite Squadron 76 (Lt. Cmdr. J.W. McCauley, USNR)
 16 FM-2 Wildcat fighters
 10 TBM Avenger torpedo bombers
 Screen
 3 destroyers 
 All Fletcher-class (5 × 5-in. main battery): McCord, Trathen, Hazelwood
 5 destroyer escorts
 4 John C. Butler-class (2 × 5-in. main battery): Edmonds, Richard M. Rowell, Richard S. Bull, Eversole
 1 Buckley-class (3 × 3-in. main battery): Coolbaugh

 "Taffy 2"
 Rear Admiral Felix B. Stump

 6 escort carriers
 Natoma Bay (Capt. Albert K. Morehouse)
 Composite Squadron 81 (Lt. Cmdr. R.C. Barnes)
 16 FM-2 Wildcat fighters 
 12 TBM Avenger torpedo bombers
 Manila Bay (Capt. Fitzhugh Lee, III)
 Composite Squadron 80 (Lt. Cmdr. H.K. Stubbs, USNR)
 16 FM-2 Wildcat fighters 
 12 TBM Avenger torpedo bombers
 Carrier Division 27 (Rear Adm. William D. Sample)
 Marcus Island (Capt. C.F. Greber)
 Composite Squadron 21 (Lt. Cmdr T.O. Murray)
 12 FM-2 Wildcat fighters 
 11 TBM Avenger torpedo bombers
 Kadashan Bay (Capt. R.N. Hunter) 
 Composite Squadron 20 (Lt. Cmdr. J.R. Dale)
 15 FM-2 Wildcat fighters 
 11 TBM Avenger torpedo bombers
 Savo Island (Capt. Clarence E. Ekstrom)
 Composite Squadron 27 (Lt. Cmdr. P.W. Jackson)
 16 FM-2 Wildcat fighters 
 12 TBM Avenger torpedo bombers	
 Ommaney Bay (Capt. H.L. Young)
 Composite Squadron 75 (Lt. Cmdr. A.W. Smith)
 16 FM-2 Wildcat fighters 
 11 TBM Avenger torpedo bombers	
 Screen (Capt. L.K. Reynolds)
 3 destroyers
 All Fletcher-class (5 × 5-in. main battery): Haggard, Franks, Hailey
 5 destroyer escorts
 All John C. Butler-class (2 × 5-in. main battery): Richard W. Suesens, Abercrombie, Oberrender, LeRay Wilson, Walter C. Wann

 "Taffy 3"
 Rear Admiral Clifton A.F. Sprague

 6 escort carriers
 Fanshaw Bay (Capt. D.P. Johnson)
 Composite Squadron 68 (Lt. Cmdr. R.S. Rogers)
 16 FM-2 Wildcat fighters 
 12 TBM Avenger torpedo bombers
 St. Lo ( at the Battle off Samar, 25 Oct) (Capt. Francis J. McKenna)
 Composite Squadron 65 (Lt. Cmdr. R.M. Jones, USMR)
 17 FM-2 Wildcat fighters 
 12 TBM Avenger torpedo bombers
 White Plains (Capt. D.J. Sullivan)
 Composite Squadron 4 (Lt. E.R. Fickenscher)
 16 FM-2 Wildcat fighters 
 12 TBM Avenger torpedo bombers
 Kalinin Bay (Capt. T.B. Williamson)
 Composite Squadron 3 (Lt. Cmdr. W.H. Keighley)
 16 FM-2 Wildcat fighters 
   1 TBF Avenger, 11 TBM Avenger torpedo bombers
 Carrier Division 26 (Rear Adm. Ralph A. Ofstie)
 Kitkun Bay (Capt. John P. Whitney)
 Composite Squadron 5 (Cmdr. R.L. Fowler)
 14 FM-2 Wildcat fighters 
 12 TBM Avenger torpedo bombers
 Gambier Bay ( at the Battle off Samar, 25 Oct) (Capt. Walter V. R. Vieweg)
 Composite Squadron 10 (Lt. Cmdr. E.J. Huxtable)
 18 FM-2 Wildcat fighters 
 12 TBM Avenger torpedo bombers
 Screen (Cmdr. W.D. Thomas)
 3 destroyers
 All Fletcher-class (5 × 5-in. main battery): Hoel ( at the Battle off Samar, 25 Oct}), Heermann, Johnston ( at the Battle off Samar, 25 Oct) 
 4 destroyer escorts
 All John C. Butler-class (2 × 5-in. main battery): Dennis, John C. Butler, Raymond, Samuel B. Roberts ( at the Battle off Samar, 25 Oct)

Minesweeping and Hydrographic Group (Task Group 77.5) 

Commander W.R. Loud

 1 frigate:  Gascoyne
 1 destroyer transport: Sands
 7 fast minesweepers: Hovey, Southard, Chandler, Long, Hamilton, Howard, Palmer
 12 minesweepers 
 7 Auk-class: Token, Tumult, Velocity, Requisite, Pursuit, Revenge, Sage
 5 Admirable-class: Salute, Saunter, Scout, Scrimmage, Sentry
 2 minelayers: Preble, Breese
 26 auxiliary motor minesweepers
 1 harbour defence motor launch:  1074

Beach Demolition Group (Task Group 77.6) 
Lt. Commander C.C. Morgan, USNR

 11 fast transports
 Embarking Underwater Demolition Teams 3, 4, 5, 6, 8, 9, 10
 8 ex-Clemson-class destroyers: Clemson, Goldsborough, Kane, Brooks, Belknap, Overton, Humphreys, George E. Badger
 2 ex-Wickes-class destroyers: Rathburne, Talbot
 1 ex-Caldwell-class destroyer: Manley

Amphibious Assault Units

Northern Attack Force (Task Force 78) 

Rear Admiral Daniel E. Barbey in amphibious command ship Blue Ridge
Embarking  X Army Corps under Maj. Gen. Franklin C. Sibert

 Palo Attack Group (Task Group 78.1): Left beaches 
 Rear Admiral Barbey
 Embarking  24th Infantry ("Taro") Division under Maj. Gen. Frederick A. Irving
 Transport Unit (Capt. T.B. Brittain)
 Transport Division 24 (Capt. Brittain)
 4 attack transports: DuPage, Fuller, Elmore, Wayne
 1 transport: John Land
 1 attack cargo ship: Aquarius
 1 landing ship dock: Gunston Hall
 Transport Division 6 (Capt. H.D. Baker)
 3 attack transports: Fayette, Ormsby, Leedstown
 1 attack cargo ship: Titania
 1 cargo ship: Hercules
 2 landing ship docks: Epping Forest, Carter Hall
 Screen (Capt. Henry Crommelin)
 4 destroyers
 All Fletcher class (5 × 5-in. main battery): John Rodgers, Murray, Harrison, McKee
 Control and Close Support Unit (Capt. N.D. Brantly)
 4 submarine chasers: 3 steel hull, 1  wooden hull
 16 landing craft infantry: 9 standard, 5 rocket, 2 gunboat
 3 patrol craft escort
 1 frigate
 3 landing ships medium
 2 fleet tugs: Apache, Quapaw

 San Ricardo Attack Group (Task Group 78.2): Right beaches
 Rear Admiral W.M. Fechteler in attack transport Fremont
 Embarking  1st Cavalry Division under Maj. Gen. Verne D. Mudge
 Transport Unit (Capt. M.O. Carlson)
 Transport Division 32 (Capt. Carlson)
 4 attack transports: Harris, Barnstable
 1 transport: Herald of the Morning
 1 attack cargo ship: Arneb
 1 landing ship dock: White Marsh
 Transport Division 20 (Capt. D.W. Loomis)
 3 attack transports: Leonard Wood, Pierce, James O'Hara
 1 transport: La Salle
 1 attack cargo ship: Electra
 1 landing ship dock: Oak Hill
 9 landing ships medium
 Screen (Capt. A.E. Jarrell)
 4 destroyers 
 3 Fletcher-class (5 × 5-in. main battery): Fletcher, Jenkins, La Vallette
 1 Sims-class (4 × 5-in. main battery): Anderson
 1 fleet tug: Sonoma
 8 landing craft infantry: 6 rocket, 2 gunboat
 14 landing ships tank

 Fire Support Unit North (Rear Adm. George L. Weyler)
 3 old battleships
 2 Colorado-class (8 × 16-in. main battery): Maryland, West Virginia
 1 New Mexico-class (12 × 14-in. main battery): Mississippi
 3 destroyers
 All Fletcher-class (5 × 5-in. main battery): Cony, Aulick, Sigourney

 Panaon Attack Group (Task Group 78.3)
 Rear Admiral A.D. Struble in Hughes
 Embarking 21st Regimental Combat Team / 24th Infantry Division
 3 landing ships infantry:  Kanimbla,  Manoora,   Westralia
 4 Fletcher-class destroyers (5 × 5-in. main battery): Sigsbee, Ringgold, Schroeder, Dashiell
 1 Sims-class destroyer (4 × 5-in. main battery): Hughes 
 1 minelayer:  Ariadne

 Dinagat Attack Group (Task Group 78.4)
 Rear Admiral Struble in Hughes
 Embarking 6th Ranger Battalion and Co. B / 21st Infantry
 5 fast transports: (all ex-Wickes-class destroyers):  Kilty, Schley, Ward, Herbert, Crosby
 2 Benham-class destroyers (4 × 5-in. main battery): Lang, Stack
 2 Tacoma-class frigates (3 × 3-in. main battery): Gallup, Bisbee
 1 fleet tug: Chickasaw

 Reinforcement Group One (Task Group 78.6)
 Captain S.P. Jenkins
 Arriving 22 October
 Amphibious assault vessels
 6 attack transports: Crescent City, Warren, Windsor, Callaway, Leon, Sumter
 1 transport: Storm King
 1 cargo ship: Jupiter
 1 repair ship: Achilles
 4 merchant ships
 32 landing ships tank
 12 landing craft infantry
 Escort (Capt. E.A. Solomons)
 4 destroyers
 2 Fletcher-class (5 × 5-in. main battery): Stevens, Howorth
 2 Sims-class (4 × 5-in. main battery): Mustin, Morris
 2  frigates
 Both Tacoma-class (3 × 3-in. main battery): Carson City, Burlington

 Reinforcement Group Two (Task Group 78.7)
 Captain J.K.P. Ginder
 Arriving 24 October
 Amphibious assault vessels
 32 landing ships tank
 24 merchant ships
 Escort (Capt. Ginder)
 4 destroyers
 All Fletcher-class (5 × 5-in. main battery): Nicholas, O'Bannon, Taylor, Hopewell
 2 frigates
 Both Tacoma-class (3 × 3-in. main battery): Muskogee, San Pedro

 Reinforcement Group Three (Task Group 78.9)
 Commander J.L. Steinmetz, USCG
 Arriving 29 October
 Amphibious assault vessels
 62 landing ships tank
 19 merchant ships
 Escort (Capt. W.M. Cole)
 5 destroyers
 All Mahan-class (5 × 5-in. main battery):  Mahan, Drayton, Lamson, Flusser, Smith
 4 frigates
 All Tacoma-class (3 × 3-in. main battery): Eugene, El Paso, Van Buren, Orange

Southern Attack Force (Task Force 79) 

Vice Admiral Theodore S. Wilkinson in amphibious command ship Mount Olympus
Embarking  XXIV Army Corps under Lieut. Gen. John R. Hodge

 Attack Group "Able" (Task Group 79.1): Left beaches
 Rear Admiral Richard L. Conolly in amphibious command ship Appalachian
 Embarking  7th Infantry "Bayonet" Division under Maj. Gen. Archibald V. Arnold

 Transport Group "Able" (Task Group 79.3)
 Captain C.G. Richardson
 Transport Division 7 (Capt. Richardson)
 3 attack transports: Cavalier, J. Franklin Bell, Feland
 1 transport: Golden City
 1 attack cargo ship: Thuban
 1 landing ship dock: Lindenwald
 Transport Division 30 (Capt. C.A. Mission)
 3 attack transports: Knox, Calvert, Custer
 1 evacuation transport: Rixey
 1 attack cargo ship: Chara
 1 landing ship dock: Ashland
 Transport Division 38 (Capt. Charles Allen)
 3 attack transports: Lamar, Alpine, Heywood
 2 transports: Starlight, Monitor
 1 attack cargo ships: Alshain
 Transport Division "X-Ray" (Capt. J.A. Snackenberg)
 2 attack transports: George Clymer, President Hayes
 1 cargo ship: Mercury
 Screen (Capt. W.J. Marshall)
 8 destroyers
 All Fletcher-class (5 × 5-in. main battery): Erben, Walker, Hale, Abbot, Black, Chauncey, Braine, Gansevoort

 Attack Group "Baker" (Task Group 79.2): Right beaches
 Rear Admiral Forrest B. Royal
 Embarking  96th Infantry ("Deadeye") Division under Maj. Gen. James L. Bradley

 TG 79.4 Transport Group "Baker" (Task Group 79.4)
 Capt. H.B. Knowles
 Transport Division 10 (Capt. G.D. Morrison)
 4 attack transports: Clay, Arthur Middleton, Baxter, William P. Biddle
 1 transport: George F. Elliott
 1 attack cargo ship: Capricornus
 1 landing ship vehicle: Catskill
 Transport Division 18 (Capt. Knowles)
 3 attack transports: Cambria, Monrovia, Frederick Funston
 1 transport: War Hawk
 1 attack cargo ship: Alcyone
 2 landing ship docks: Casa Grande, Rushmore
 Transport Division 28 (Capt. H.C. Flanagan)
 3 attack transports: Bolivar, Sheridan, Doyen
 1 transport: Comet
 1 attack cargo ship: Almaack
 1 landing ship dock: Belle Grove
 Screen (Capt. E.R. McLean)
 9 destroyers
 8 Fletcher-class (5 × 5-in. main battery): Picking, Sproston, Wickes, Isherwood, Charles J. Badger, Halligan, Haraden, Twiggs
 1 Farragut-class (4 × 5-in. main battery): MacDonough

 Fire Support Unit South
 Rear Admiral Jesse B. Oldendorf in heavy cruiser Louisville
 Battleship Division 2 (Rear Adm. Theodore E. Chandler)
 3 old battleships
 2 Tennessee-class (12 × 14-in. main battery): Tennessee, California
 1 Pennsylvania-class (12 × 14-in. main battery): Pennsylvania
 Cruiser Division 4 (Rear Adm. Oldendorf)
 3 heavy cruisers
 1 New Orleans-class (9 × 8-in. main battery): Minneapolis
 1 Portland-class (9 × 8-in. main battery): Portland
 1 Northampton-class (9 × 8-in. main battery): Louisville
 Cruiser Division 9 (Rear Adm. Walden L. Ainsworth)
 1 light cruiser
 1 Brooklyn-class (15 × 6-in. main battery): Honolulu
 Cruiser Division 12 (Rear Adm. Robert W. Hayler)
 2 light cruisers
 Both Cleveland-class (12 × 6-in. main battery): Denver, Columbia
 Screen (Capt. Roland N. Smoot)
 13 destroyers
 11 Fletcher-class (5 × 5-in. main battery): Leutze, Newcomb, Bennion,  Heywood L. Edwards, Richard P. Leary, Robinson, Ross, Albert W. Grant, Bryant, Halford, Claxton
 2 Gleaves-class (4 × 5-in. main battery): Thorn, Welles

Service and Support Units

Service Force Seventh Fleet (Task Group 77.7) 

Rear Admiral R.O. Glover
 Fueling at Sea Unit (Capt. J.D. Beard)
 7 oilers: Saranac, Ashtabula, Salamonie, Suamico, Kishwaukee, Schuylkill, Tallulah
 5 ammunition ships: Mazama, Durham Victory, Iran Victory, Bluefield Victory, Canada Victory
 Escort Unit (Cmdr. F.W. Howers)
 3 Buckley-class destroyer escorts (3 × 3-in. main battery): Whitehurst, Witter, Bowers
 Leyte Gulf Unit (Capt. E.P. Hylant)
 6 tankers: Arethusa, Caribou, Mink, Panda, Porcupine,  Bishopdale
 1 water tanker: Severn
 4 net tenders: Indus, Teak, Silverbell, Satinleaf
 3 repair and salvage vessels: Achilles, Cable, Midas
 1 floating dry dock: ARD-19
 4 ammunition ships: Murzim, Poyang, Ranvr, Yunnan
 9 provision ships: Arequipa, Calamaries, Mizar, Octane, Crux, Ganymede, Triangulum, Pollux, Acubens,  Merkur
 2 hospital ships: Mercy, Comfort

US Third Fleet 

Admiral William F. Halsey in fast battleship New Jersey

Fast Carrier Force (Task Force 38) 
Vice Admiral Marc A. Mitscher in fleet carrier Lexington

Task Group 38.1 

Vice Admiral John S. McCain Sr.

 2 fleet carriers
 Hornet (Capt. Austin K. Doyle)
 Air Group 11 (Cmdr. F.R. Schrader)
 VF-11: 33 F6F Hellcat fighters, 4 F6F-xN Hellcat night fighters
 VB-11: 25 SB2C Helldiver dive bombers
 VT-11:   1 TBF Avenger, 17 TBM Avenger torpedo bombers
 Wasp (Capt. O.A. Weller)
 Air Group 14 (Cmdr. W.C. Wingard)
 VF-14: 38 F6F Hellcat fighters, 4 F6F-xN Hellcat night fighters
 VB-14: 10 F6F Hellcat fighters, 25 SB2C Helldiver dive bombers
 VT-14:   6 TBF Avenger, 12 TBM Avenger torpedo bombers

 2 light carriers
 Monterey (Capt. Stuart H. Ingersoll)
 Air Group 28 (Lt. Cmdr. R.W. Mehle)
 VF-28: 23 F6F Hellcat fighters
 VT-28:   9 TBM Avenger torpedo bombers
 Cowpens (Capt. H.W. Taylor)
 Air Group 22 (Lt. Cmdr. T.H. Jenkins)
 VF-22: 26 F6F Hellcat fighters
 VT-22:   9 TBM Avenger torpedo bombers

 Cruiser Division 6 (Rear Adm. C. Turner Joy)
 1 heavy cruiser (9 × 8-in. main battery)
 Wichita

 Cruiser Division 10 (Rear Adm. Lloyd J. Wiltse)
 2 heavy cruisers
 Both Baltimore-class (9 × 8-in. main battery): Boston, Canberra
 1 light cruiser
 1 Cleveland-class (12 × 6-in. main battery): Houston

 Screen (Capt. C.F. Espe)
 15 destroyers
 13 Fletcher-class (5 × 5-in. main battery): Izard, Charrette, Conner, Bell, Burns, Cogswell, Caperton, Ingersoll, Knapp, Boyd, Cowell, Brown, Woodworth
 2 Gleaves-class (4 × 5-in. main battery): McCalla, Grayson

Task Group 38.2 

Rear Admiral Gerald F. Bogan

 3 fleet carriers
 Intrepid (Capt. J.F. Bolger)
 Air Group 18 (Cmdr. W.E. Ellis)
 VF-18: 38 F6F Hellcat fighters, 5 F6F-xN Hellcat night fighters
 VB-18: 28 SB2C Helldiver dive bombers
 VT-18: 18 TBM Avenger torpedo bombers
 Hancock (Capt. F.C. Dickey)
 Air Group 7 (Cmdr. J.D. Lamade)
 VF-7: 37 F6F Hellcat fighters, 4 F6F-xN Hellcat night fighters
 VB-7: 42 SB2C Helldiver dive bombers
 VT-7: 18 TBM Avenger torpedo bombers
 Bunker Hill (Capt. M.R. Greer)
 Air Group 8 (Cmdr. R.L. Shifley)
 VF-8: 40 F6F Hellcat fighters, 8 F6F-xN Hellcat night fighters
 VB-8: 17 SB2C Helldiver, 3 SBF Helldiver, 4 SBW Helldiver  dive bombers
 VT-8: 19 TBM Avenger torpedo bombers

 2 light carriers
 Cabot (Capt. S.J. Michael)
 Air Group 29 (Lt. Cmdr. W.E. Eder)
 VF-29: 21 F6F Hellcat fighters
 VT-29:   1 TBF Avenger, 8 TBM Avenger torpedo bombers
 Independence (Capt. E.C. Ewen)
 Night Air Group 41 (Cmdr. T.F. Caldwell)
 VFN-41:  5 F6F Hellcat fighters, 14 F6F-xN Hellcat night fighters
 VTN-41:  8 TBM Avenger torpedo bombers

 Battleship Division 7 (Rear Adm. Oscar C. Badger II)
 2 fast battleships
 Both Iowa-class (9 × 16-in. main battery): Iowa, New Jersey

 Cruiser Division 14 (Rear Adm. Francis E. M. Whiting)
 2 light cruisers
 Both Cleveland-class (12 × 6-in. main battery): Vincennes, Miami
 2 anti-aircraft light cruisers:
 Both Atlanta-class: San Diego, Oakland

 Screen (Capt. John P. Womble)
 18 destroyers
 All Fletcher class (5 × 5-in. main battery): Owen, Miller, The Sullivans, Stephen Potter, Tingey, Hickox, Hunt, Lewis Hancock, Marshall, Halsey Powell, Cushing, Colahan, Uhlmann, Benham, Stockham, Wedderburn, Twining, Yarnall

Task Group 38.3 
Rear Admiral Frederick C. Sherman

 2 fleet carriers
 Essex (Capt. C.W. Wheeler)
 Air Group 15 (Cmdr. H.T. Utter)
 VF-15: 46 F6F Hellcat fighters, 4 F6F-xN Hellcat night fighters
 VB-15: 25 SB2C Helldiver dive bombers
 VT-15: 15 TBF Avenger, 5 TBM Avenger torpedo bombers
 Lexington (Capt. E.W. Litch)
 Air Group 19 (Cmdr. T.H. Winters)
 VF-19: 37 F6F Hellcat fighters, 4 F6F-xN Hellcat night fighters
 VB-19: 30 SB2C Helldiver dive bombers
 VT-19: 18 TBM Avenger torpedo bombers

2 light carriers
 Princeton (Capt. W.H. Buracker)
 Air Group 27 (Lt. Cmdr. F.A. Bardshar)
 VF-27: 21 F6F Hellcat fighters
 VT-27:   9 TBM Avenger torpedo bombers
 Langley (Capt. J.F. Wegforth)
 Air Group 44 (Cmdr. M.T. Wordell)
 VF-44: 25 F6F Hellcat fighters
 VT-44:   9 TBM Avenger torpedo bombers

 4 fast battleships (Vice Adm. Willis Augustus Lee)
 1 North Carolina-class (9 × 16-in. main battery): Washington
 Battleship Division 8 (Rear Adm. Glenn B. Davis)
 1 South Dakota-class (9 × 16-in. main battery): Massachusetts
 Battleship Division 9 (Rear Adm. Edward Hanson)
 2 South Dakota-class (9 × 16-in. main battery): Alabama, South Dakota

  Cruiser Division 13 (Rear Adm. Laurance T. DuBose)
 3 light cruisers
 All Cleveland-class (12 × 6-in. main battery): Santa Fe, Mobile, Birmingham
 1 anti-aircraft light cruiser
 1 Atlanta-class (12 × 5-in. main battery): Reno

 Screen (Capt. C.R. Todd)
 14 destroyers
 All Fletcher class (5 × 5-in. main battery): Clarence K. Bronson, Cotten, Dortch, Gatling, Healy, Porterfield, Callaghan, Cassin Young, Irwin, Preston, Laws, Longshaw, Morrison, Prichett

Task Group 38.4 

Rear Admiral Ralph E. Davison

 2 fleet carriers
 Franklin (Capt. J.M. Shoemaker)
 Air Group 13 (Cmdr. R.L. Kibbe)
 VF-13: 34 F6F Hellcat fighters, 4 F6F-xN Hellcat night fighters
 VB-13: 31 SB2C Helldiver dive bombers
 VT-13: 18 TBM Avenger torpedo bombers
 Enterprise (Capt. Cato D. Glover)
 Air Group 20 (Cmdr. D.F. Smith)
 VF-20: 35 F6F Hellcat fighters, 4 F6F-xN Hellcat night fighters
 VB-20: 34 SB2C Helldiver dive bombers
 VT-20: 19 TBF Avenger, 5 TBM Avenger torpedo bombers

 2 light carriers
 San Jacinto (Capt. M.H. Kernodle)
 Air Group 51 (Cmdr. C.L. Moore)
 VF-51: 19 F6F Hellcat fighters
 VT-51:   7 TBM Avenger torpedo bombers
 Belleau Wood (Capts. John Perry)
 Air Group 21 (Lt. Cmdr. V.F. Casey)
 VF-21: 25 F6F Hellcat fighters
 VT-21:   9 TBM Avenger torpedo bombers

 1 heavy cruiser
 1 New Orleans-class (9 × 8-in. main battery): New Orleans

 1 light cruiser
 1 Cleveland-class (12 × 6-in. main battery): Biloxi

 Screen (Capt. V.D. Long)
 11 destroyers
 3 Gleaves-class (4 × 5-in. main battery): Wilkes, Nicholson, Swanson
 3 Gridley-class (4 × 5-in. main battery): Gridley, McCall, Maury
 5 Bagley-class (4 × 5-in. main battery): Bagley, Helm, Mugford, Patterson, Ralph Talbot

Notes

References

Bibliography 

Leyte
Pacific Ocean theatre of World War II
Leyte
Battle of Leyte Gulf
Leyte
Leyte
October 1944 events
Leyte
United States Navy in World War II